Nicholas Preston, 6th Viscount Gormanston (1606–1643) sat in the House of Lords of the Irish Parliament of 1634–1635 and sided with the insurgents after the Irish Rebellion of 1641.

Birth and origins 
Nicholas was born about 1608, the eldest son of Jenico Preston and his wife Margaret St. Lawrence. His father was the 5th Viscount Gormanston. His father's family descended from Robert Preston, 1st Baron Gormanston whose ancestors had come from Preston, Lancashire, England, some generations before. His mother was a daughter of Nicholas St Lawrence, 9th Baron Howth.

Marriages and children 
Preston married Mary Barnewall. She was a daughter of Nicholas Barnewall, 1st Viscount Barnewall and Lady Bridget FitzGerald. Her family was Old English.

 
Nicholas and Mary had two sons:
Jenico (died 1691), his successor
Nicholas, married his cousin Elizabeth Preston, daughter of Anthony Preston, 2nd Viscount Tara

—and two daughters, who do not seem to be known by name.

6th Viscount and House of Lords 
Preston succeeded his father in 1630 as the 6th Viscount Gormanston. Gormanston, as he was now, sat in the House of Lords during the two Irish parliaments of King Charles I.

Parliament of 1634–1635 
The Irish Parliament of 1634–1635 was opened on 14 July 1634 by the new Lord Deputy of Ireland, Thomas Wentworth (the future Lord Strafford), who had taken office in July 1633. Gormanston took his seat on the day of opening, the 14 July 1634. Wentworth asked to vote taxes: six subsidies of £50,000 (equivalent to about £ in ) were passed unanimously by both houses. The parliament also belatedly and incompletely ratified the Graces of 1628, in which the King conceded rights for money.

Parliament of 1640–1649 
The Irish Parliament of 1640–1649. was opened on 16 March 1640 by Christopher Wandesford, whom Strafford, as Wentworth was now called, had appointed Lord Deputy. Strafford arrived two days later. Gormanston was there on the 18 March.

In its first session the parliament unanimously voted four subsidies of £45,000 (about £ in ) to raise an Irish army of 9000 for use by the King against the Scots in the Second Bishops' War. On 3 April 1640 Strafford left Ireland.

The Lords sent a separate delegation for their grievances. Gormanston was part of it.

Death 
Gormantown died on 29 July 1643, aged about 35. He was posthumously outlawed on 17 November 1643. He was succeeded by his elder son Jenico as the 7th Viscount Gormanston.

Notes and references

Notes

Citations

Sources 

 
 
  – 1603 to 1642
 
 
  – 1613 to 1641
  – G to K (for Gormanston)
 
  – (for timeline)
 
 
 
 
  – 1634 to 1699
 
 

1606 births
1643 deaths